Tri-City (or Tri City) is a census-designated place (CDP) and unincorporated community in Douglas County, Oregon, United States. The population was 3,931 at the 2010 census. The community in Missouri Bottom near the Umpqua River is named for the three cities among which it is centered: Myrtle Creek, Canyonville and Riddle. The Tri City School District probably originated the name, which was later adopted by the local sewer district and the former Tri City State Airport (now known as the Myrtle Creek Municipal Airport).

Geography

Demographics

As of the census of 2000, there were 3,519 people, 1,348 households, and 997 families residing in the CDP. The population density was 465.1 people per square mile (179.5/km2). There were 1,409 housing units at an average density of 186.2 per square mile (71.9/km2). The racial makeup of the CDP was 93.78% White, 0.14% African American, 1.79% Native American, 0.51% Asian, 0.03% Pacific Islander, 0.28% from other races, and 3.47% from two or more races. Hispanic or Latino of any race were 2.84% of the population.

There were 1,348 households, out of which 30.0% had children under the age of 18 living with them, 57.2% were married couples living together, 11.8% had a female householder with no husband present, and 26.0% were non-families. 20.0% of all households were made up of individuals, and 9.7% had someone living alone who was 65 years of age or older. The average household size was 2.60 and the average family size was 2.96.

In the CDP, the population was spread out, with 25.3% under the age of 18, 9.0% from 18 to 24, 25.0% from 25 to 44, 23.8% from 45 to 64, and 16.9% who were 65 years of age or older. The median age was 38 years. For every 100 females, there were 95.5 males. For every 100 females age 18 and over, there were 93.4 males.

The median income for a household in the CDP was $33,306, and the median income for a family was $37,301. Males had a median income of $31,192 versus $20,719 for females. The per capita income for the CDP was $15,017. About 9.3% of families and 13.9% of the population were below the poverty line, including 23.6% of those under age 18 and 5.0% of those age 65 or over.

References

Census-designated places in Oregon
Unincorporated communities in Douglas County, Oregon
Census-designated places in Douglas County, Oregon
Unincorporated communities in Oregon